Pauba Valley is a valley along the course of Temecula Creek, in Riverside County, California. 

The valley is bounded on the north and southwest by hills of the ancient eroding sediments of the Temecula Basin and on the northeast and southeast by Oak Mountain.

References

Further reading
 

 	
Valleys of California
Valleys of Riverside County, California